Pareh may refer to:
 Pareh, East Azerbaijan (پره - Pareh)
 Pareh, Gilan (پره - Pareh)
 Pareh, Izeh, Khuzestan Province (پره - Pareh)
 Pareh-ye Olya, West Azerbaijan Province (پاره - Pāreh)
 Pareh-ye Sofla, West Azerbaijan Province (پاره - Pāreh)